FC BATE Borisov (FK BATE Borisov ; , BATE Barysaw) is a professional Belarusian football team from the city of Barysaw. The club competes in the Belarusian Premier League, of which they are the league's most successful club with 15 titles, including 13 won consecutively. The club has also won four Belarusian Cups and four Belarusian Super Cups.

BATE is the only Belarusian team to have qualified for the group stage of the UEFA Champions League (2008–09, 2011–12, 2012–13, 2014–15 and 2015–16) and one of two to qualify for the group stage of the UEFA Europa League (2009–10, 2010–11, 2017–18 and 2018–19), along with Dinamo Minsk.

The club's home stadium is Borisov Arena, which was opened in 2014.

History 
BATE is an acronym of Borisov Automobile and Tractor Electronics. The team was founded in 1973 and managed to win Belarusian Soviet Socialist Republic league three times (1974, 1976 and 1979) before being disbanded in 1984. The club was re-established by Anatoli Kapski in 1996. Since then, BATE have won the Belarusian Premier League 15 times and competed in UEFA competitions.

In 2001, BATE reached the first round of the UEFA Cup, their first appearance in the competition beyond the qualifying rounds. 2008 saw BATE becoming the first Belarusian team to qualify for the group stages of the UEFA Champions League. As of 2015, BATE have played five times in the Champions League group stage, as well as twice in UEFA Europa League group stage, also reaching the knockout phase of the latter competition in 2010–11 and 2012–13.

Notable former players of BATE include Alexander Hleb (VfB Stuttgart, Arsenal, Barcelona and Birmingham City); Vitali Kutuzov (Milan, Sporting CP, Avellino, Sampdoria, Parma, Pisa and Bari) and Yuri Zhevnov (FC Moscow, and Zenit Saint Petersburg). Having started their professional careers with BATE, all are also former or present members of the Belarus national team.

BATE won their tenth consecutive league title in 2015, with four matches to spare. In the 2017 season, BATE drew an average home league attendance of 5,633, the second-highest in the league.

Supporters 
BATE Borisov is one of the most popular football teams in Belarus. BATE fans have developed a rivalry with the fans of Dinamo Minsk and a friendship with fans of Polish club Piast Gliwice since 2011.

Current squad

Honours 
 Belarusian Premier League
 Winners (15): 1999, 2002, 2006, 2007, 2008, 2009, 2010, 2011, 2012, 2013, 2014, 2015, 2016, 2017, 2018
 Runners-up (7): 1998, 2000, 2003, 2004, 2019, 2020, 2021
 Belarusian Cup
 Winners (5): 2005–06, 2009–10, 2014–15, 2019–20, 2020–21
 Runners-up (6): 2001–02, 2004–05, 2006–07, 2015–16, 2017–18, 2021–22
 Belarusian Super Cup
 Winners (8): 2010, 2011, 2013, 2014, 2015, 2016, 2017, 2022
 Runners-up (4): 2012, 2018, 2019, 2021
 Belarusian Second League
 Winners: 1996
 Football Championship of the Belarusian SSR
 Winners (3): 1974, 1976, 1979

Kit suppliers and shirt sponsors

League and Cup history 

1 Including play-off (1–0 win) for the first place against Neman Grodno, as both teams finished with equal points.

European record 

As of match played 28 July 2022

Managers 
  Leu Mazurkevich (1973–1981)
  Yury Puntus (1 March 1996 – 30 November 2004)
  Igor Kriushenko (1 January 2005 – 12 November 2007)
  Viktor Goncharenko (13 November 2007 – 12 October 2013)
  Alyaksandr Yermakovich (12 October 2013 – 31 December 2017)
  Oleg Dulub (5 January 2018 – 3 June 2018)
  Aleksey Baga (4 June 2018 – 19 December 2019)
  Kirill Alshevsky (1 January 2020 – 22 September 2020)
  Aleksandr Lisovsky (22 September 2020 – 31 December 2020)
  Vitaly Zhukovsky (1 January 2021 –)

References

External links 

 
Association football clubs established in 1973
Football clubs in Belarus
1973 establishments in Belarus
Barysaw